"Save Me" is a 1974 song by the German Euro disco group Silver Convention, which became a hit in Germany. It features lead vocals by three session musicians identified only as Ingrid, Wilma and Monica. It is included in the album of the same name. It also was heavily played in disco clubs in many countries. Silver Convention later re-recorded the song as "Save Me '77" for the album Summernights. Today the original version of the song has appeared on several '70s disco compilations, as well as most "greatest hits" albums by Silver Convention. The song features repetitive lyrics consisting of the line "Baby save me, save me, I am falling in love". The song was also a hit in the UK and the Netherlands.

Charts

References

1975 singles
Silver Convention songs